Zbrzyca is a river in Pomeranian Voivodship, Poland.

It the upper flow it passes the lakes  Wielkie Sarnowicze, Somińskie, Kruszyńskie, Parzyn. In the middle flow it passes the lakes Milachowo, Laska, Księże, Parszczenica, Śluza.

References

Rivers of Pomeranian Voivodeship
Rivers of Poland